Oliver Tobias Freitag (born 6 August 1947), known professionally as Oliver Tobias, is a Swiss-born UK-based film, stage, and television actor and director.

Biography

Born in Zürich, Switzerland, he is the son of the Austrian-Swiss actor Robert Freitag and the German actress Maria Becker. He came to the United Kingdom at the age of eight and trained at East 15 Acting School, London. In 1968, he appeared in the original London production of Hair, playing the prime rebel role of Berger. The following year, he starred in, directed, and choreographed the rock opera in Amsterdam and, in 1970, directed a production in Tel Aviv.

Film career

Tobias's first role was in the feature film Romance of a Horsethief, co-starring with Yul Brynner, Serge Gainsbourg and Eli Wallach. He then co-starred with Charlotte Rampling in the Jacobean tragedy 'Tis Pity She's a Whore, a film directed by Giuseppe Patroni Griffi. He became popular as Arthur in the TV series Arthur of the Britons (1972). Peter Weir then directed him in the TV series Luke's Kingdom.

Many other successful films followed, including The Stud in 1978 in which he co-starred with Joan Collins, helping to rekindle her career. In 1981, he starred in the British television series Dick Turpin's Greatest Adventure, where he played the character Noll Bridger, a Colonial North American. Tobias also starred in Smuggler (1981) a children's drama series, set in Cornwall in 1801. Oliver also appeared as The Devil in the promotional video for Ultravox's 1982 hit "Hymn". Tobias became a frontrunner for the role of James Bond in Octopussy (1983) when Roger Moore intended to retire from the role, but Moore was ultimately recast.

In 1991, Tobias starred alongside Charles Gray in the sci-fi movie "Firestar – First Contact" for Ice International Films.  In 1996, Tobias played Rebecque, an aide to the Prince of Orange (Paul Bettany), in Sharpe's Waterloo. In 1998, he played Bassa Selim in Mozart in Turkey. In 2000, he starred in the West End musical La Cava. Three years later, he portrayed Percival Brown in the 50th-anniversary production of The Boy Friend and the next year toured in the rock musical Footloose. In 2005, he finished shooting the film An Airfield in England. He has been acting in a variety of roles for German and Swiss TV and has recently reprised the role of Bassa Selim in Mozart's Seraglio at the Teatro Lirico in Cagliari, Italy. Tobias is famous for his voiceover work and was the narrator on the opening track of DJ Shadow's 2006 album The Outsider.

Personal life

In 2001, he married Arabella Zamoyska, with whom he has two sons.

Filmography

Film

Television

References

External links 
 

1947 births
Living people
Alumni of East 15 Acting School
English male film actors
English male stage actors
English male television actors
20th-century English male actors
21st-century English male actors
Swiss male film actors
Swiss male stage actors
Swiss male television actors
20th-century Swiss male actors
21st-century Swiss male actors
Swiss emigrants to the United Kingdom
Male actors from Zürich
Waldorf school alumni
Swiss people of Austrian descent
Swiss people of German descent
English people of Austrian descent
English people of German descent
Male actors from London